Starseed is a science fiction novel by Spider Robinson and Jeanne Robinson. It first appeared in seven parts in Pulphouse Weekly in 1991. It is a sequel to Stardance and was published as a standalone novel later that year. It was republished in 1997 as an omnibus edition with Stardance.

References

American science fiction novels
1991 American novels
Novels first published in serial form
Ace Books books